There are 47 Grade II* listed buildings in Cambridge, England. In the United Kingdom, a listed building is a building or structure of special historical or architectural importance. These buildings are legally protected from demolition, as well as from any extensions or alterations that would adversely affect the building's character or destroy historic features. Listed buildings in England are divided into three categories—Grade II buildings are buildings of special interest; Grade II* buildings are buildings of particular importance; and Grade I buildings, which are those of "exceptional" interest. Around four per cent of listed buildings are given Grade II* status.

Cambridge is a university town located in East Anglia, England. It is home to the University of Cambridge, founded in 1209, and many of the listed buildings are part of the university or its constituent colleges.

List

|}

Notes

See also
 Grade I listed buildings in Cambridge
 Grade II* listed buildings in Cambridgeshire
 Grade II* listed buildings in South Cambridgeshire
 Grade II* listed buildings in Huntingdonshire
 Grade II* listed buildings in Fenland
 Grade II* listed buildings in East Cambridgeshire
 Grade II* listed buildings in Peterborough (unitary)

References

External links

 
Lists of Grade II* listed buildings in Cambridgeshire
Grade II* listed buildings in England by city